Narasimha II may refer to any of the following Indian rulers:

 Narasimha II of Vemulavada, a 10th-century Rashtrakuta vassal king from the Chalukya dynasty of Vemulavada
 Vira Narasimha II, a 13th-century Hoysala king
 Narasimha Raya II, a 16th-century Saluva king of Vijayanagara